The Crystal Palace was an exhibition hall built for the Montreal Industrial Exhibition of 1860, originally located at the foot of Victoria Street (one block west of University) between Sainte-Catherine and Cathcart Streets, then relocated to Fletcher's Field. It was used for temporary exhibitions, and in winter, housed an ice skating rink.

Construction
The building was designed by Montreal architect John William Hopkins. It had an iron framework, a tinned barrel-vaulted nave and two galleries, each twenty feet wide, extending all the way around the interior. Its design was inspired by The Crystal Palace in London. Its main facades were of iron and glass. Its side walls were of white brick with rose-coloured contrast, with the iron and wood elements painted to match the brick. Its bays were subdivided by three arches, with only the centre arch glazed. Constructed in 20-foot modules, the Crystal Palace was intended to be 180 x 200 feet, but  was constructed with shorter transepts, reducing its dimensions to 180 x 120 feet.

1860 Industrial Exhibition
The Industrial Exhibition displayed agricultural and industrial products from the then British North America. The displays ranged from minerals, native woods, seeds and grains, preserved birds and fish, oils and foodstuffs to textiles and leather goods, furniture, clothing, machinery, iron work, tools and crafts. As part of the exhibition the Art Association of Montreal, the future Montreal Museum of Fine Arts, organized a display of Canadian art. The Prince of Wales visited Montreal that year and officially opened the exhibition.

Skating rink
The large open space of the exhibition hall was suitable for other uses. In later years, the hall would house a natural ice skating rink in the winter, and was one of the first indoor skating rinks in Canada. The skating rink was used by McGill University students to play ice hockey and the rink is the site of the first known photograph of ice hockey players in hockey uniforms, taken in 1881.

The rink also housed the Crystal Skating Club and Crystal Hockey Club, more commonly known as the Montreal Crystals which played men's senior-level amateur hockey in the Amateur Hockey Association of Canada.

Relocation and fire
In 1878 it was dismantled and moved to Fletcher's Field, part of which is now known as Jeanne-Mance Park. In July 1896, the Crystal Palace was destroyed by fire, as London's original Crystal Palace would be 40 years later in 1936. The site of the Crystal Palace, between Mont-Royal Avenue and Saint-Joseph Boulevard, was developed for housing a few years after the fire.

The original downtown location later was home to the Palace Theatre, a movie house, and today contains an alley named Ruelle Palace.

References

External links
See photographs at the McCord Museum website:
 exterior
 1881 ice hockey photograph

Buildings and structures in Montreal
Burned buildings and structures in Canada
Defunct indoor arenas in Canada
Defunct indoor ice hockey venues in Canada
Defunct sports venues in Canada
Downtown Montreal
History of Montreal
Infrastructure completed in 1860
Relocated buildings and structures in Canada
Sports venues completed in 1860
Sports venues in Montreal
World's fair architecture in Montreal